Count Carl Gustaf Bloomfield Eric von Rosen (2 June 1879 in Stockholm – 25 April 1948 Skeppsholmen, Stockholm) was a Swedish honorary doctor, patron, explorer, ethnographer, prominent figure in the Swedish upper class and a leading figure in Sweden's own national socialist movement in the 1930s.

Family
Von Rosen was married to Baroness Mary Fock (1886–1967) with whom he had six children: Björn (b. 1905), Mary (b. 1906), Carl Gustaf von Rosen (b. 1909), Birgitta (b. 1913), Egil (b. 1919), and Anna (b. 1926). Eric von Rosen's father was Count Carl Gustaf von Rosen and his mother was Ella Carlton Moore of Philadelphia, Pennsylvania, a descendant of the Winthrop family. His grandmother was the writer and philanthropist Clara Jessup Moore. He was brother to Count Clarence von Rosen.  His grandson (through Birgitta) is the film director Peter Nestler, who in 2009 made a film about Rosen called Death and Devil (Tod und Teufel).

Relationship to Hermann Göring

Von Rosen became brother-in-law to Hermann Göring when his wife's sister, Carin von Kantzow, married Göring. The pair became acquainted when Göring was flying Eric von Rosen in bad weather from Stockholm to Rockelstad Castle, at the lake Båven in Sörmland, Sweden. Due to bad weather conditions, Göring had to stay at the castle. There he became acquainted with the sister of von Rosen's wife, Carin von Kantzow. She was at that time married to a Swedish officer, but would be his future wife and greatest love.

The von Rosen swastika
Eric von Rosen had been using a swastika as a personal owner's mark. He originally saw the symbol on runestones in Gotland, while at school. Knowing that the symbol signified good luck for the Vikings, he utilized the symbol and had it carved into all his luggage when going on an expedition to South America in 1901. Being a friend of Finland, in March 1918 he gave the newly independent state an aircraft, which signified the beginning of the Finnish Air Force. The aircraft, a license manufactured Morane-Saulnier MS Parasol/Thulin D, was marked with his badge, a blue swastika on a white background. The Finnish Air Force adopted this roundel as their national insignia.

Göring had noted the swastika during his stay in Sweden and at von Rosens' castle (forged into a metal piece at the fireplace). However, the swastika of the German Nazi party had been adopted already in 1920, two years before Göring met Adolf Hitler.

References

External links

Rockelstad castle's home page

1879 births
1948 deaths
Politicians from Stockholm
Swedish explorers
Swedish collaborators with Nazi Germany
Swedish Nazis
Swedish people of American descent
Swedish people of English descent